The Play-offs of the 2004 Fed Cup Europe/Africa Zone Group III were the final stages of the Group I Zonal Competition involving teams from Europe and Africa. Using the positions determined in their pools, the eight teams faced off to determine their placing in the 2004 Fed Cup Europe/Africa Zone Group III. The top two teams advanced to Group II for next year.

Promotion play-offs
The first and second placed teams of each pool were placed against each other in two head-to-head rounds. The winner of the rounds advanced to Group II.

Norway vs. Malta

Algeria vs. Tunisia

Fifth to Seventh play-off
The third and fourth placed teams of each pool were placed against each other in two head-to-head rounds. The winner of the rounds were allocated fifth place in the Group, while the losers were allocated seventh.

Bosnia and Herzegovina vs. Kenya

Namibia vs. Botswana

Final Placements

  and  advanced to Group II, where they both placed seventh and thus were relegated back to Group III for 2006.

See also
Fed Cup structure

References

External links
 Fed Cup website

2004 Fed Cup Europe/Africa Zone